Andreas Richter (born 15 September 1977 in Cottbus, East Germany) is a German former footballer and currently the assistant manager of Energie Cottbus U19.

Career 
He made his debut on the professional league level in the 2. Bundesliga for FC Rot-Weiß Erfurt on 8 August 2004 when he started a game against 1. FC Saarbrücken.

References

External links 
 
 Andreas Richter at Lupa

1977 births
Living people
Sportspeople from Cottbus
German footballers
Association football defenders
FC Rot-Weiß Erfurt players
TuS Koblenz players
Chemnitzer FC players
FC Energie Cottbus II players
2. Bundesliga players
3. Liga players
Footballers from Brandenburg